Burgwalde is a municipality in the district of Eichsfeld in Thuringia, Germany, part of the Verwaltungsgemeinschaft Hanstein-Rusteberg.

References

External links
Verwaltungsgemeinschaft Hanstein-Rusteberg

Eichsfeld (district)